Jay Bonansinga is an American writer and director. He has written a number of fiction and non-fiction works, co-wrote the novels based on The Walking Dead comics series, including  The Walking Dead: Rise of the Governor (2011)<ref>{{cite web|url=http://www.mtv.com/news/articles/1695391/walking-dead-season-three-woodbury.jhtml|title=Walking Dead' Season Three: The Road To Woodbury|publisher=MTV|date=2012-10-12|accessdate=2012-10-23}}</ref> and The Walking Dead: The Road to Woodbury (2012), among others. He also directed a short film, City of Men, and a feature film, Stash.

Credited works

Bibliography

Fiction
1994 The Black Mariah1995 Sick1997 The Killer's Game1998 Head Case2000 Bloodhound2001 The Sleep Police2004 Oblivion2005 Frozen2006 Twisted2007 Shattered2008 Perfect Victim2011 The Walking Dead: Rise of the Governor (with Robert Kirkman)
2012 The Walking Dead: The Road to Woodbury (with Robert Kirkman)
2012 Just Another Day at the Office: A Walking Dead Short2013  The Walking Dead: The Fall of the Governor (with Robert Kirkman)
2014  The Walking Dead: Descent2015  The Walking Dead: Invasion2015  Lucid2016  The Walking Dead: Search and Destroy2016  Self Storage2017  The Walking Dead: Return to WoodburyNon-Fiction
2005 The Sinking of the Eastland: America's Forgotten Tragedy2011 Triumph of The Walking Dead: Robert Kirkman's Zombie Epic on Page and Screen2012 Pinkerton's War: The Civil War's Greatest Spy and the Birth of the U.S. Secret Service''

References

External links
 
Jay Bonansinga's website

20th-century American novelists
20th-century American male writers
21st-century American novelists
American horror writers
American male screenwriters
American film directors
American film producers
Living people
American male novelists
American male short story writers
20th-century American short story writers
21st-century American short story writers
21st-century American male writers
Year of birth missing (living people)